A wireless LAN controller (WLC) is a network device used to monitor and manage wireless access points in an organization. WLCs are connected to routers and allow devices from across the organization to connect to the router via access points. WLCs are generally used in combination with the Lightweight Access Point Protocol (LWAPP) to manage light-weight access points in bulk by the network administrator or network operations center. The wireless LAN controller is part of the Data Plane within the Cisco Wireless Model.

The WLAN controller automatically handles the configuration of wireless access-points. It centralizes wireless network infrastructure and handles bandwidth allocation to the access points (APs). Before the use of WLCs were widespread, APs had to handle connections individually, leading to unstable data links and poor connections. Use of WLANs solves this problem.

Benefits of WLCs 

 WLCs provide an added layer of security to APs, by providing authentication at a higher level, detecting rogue devices and by protecting the network behind a firewall.
 WLCs allow for centralized AP deployment.
 They simplify network maintenance operations.

References

External links
 "Why is a Controller required in a wireless network", ExcITingIP.com, March 2010
 "Facts About The Advantages Of Wireless 5 GHz:" , Bestofwhatsapp.in, September 2019

Wireless networking